Jakarta United Football Club (formerly known as Jakarta Timur F.C.) is an  Indonesian football club based in South Jakarta, Jakarta. They play in Liga 3. Their home ground is Soemantri Brodjonegoro Stadium, which is situated in Kuningan, South Jakarta, Jakarta.

References

External links
Liga-Indonesia.co.id

South Jakarta
Football clubs in Jakarta
Football clubs in Indonesia
Association football clubs established in 2005
2005 establishments in Indonesia